Marcos Paulo Lima Barbeiro (born 29 July 1995) is a Santomean footballer who plays for Real SC as a midfielder.

Football career
On 17 August 2014, Barbeiro made his professional debut with Marítimo B in a 2014–15 Segunda Liga match against Portimonense.

International goals
Scores and results São Tomé and Príncipe's goal tally first.

References

External links

Stats and profile at LPFP 

Marcos Barbeiro's profile on C.S. Marítimo official website

1995 births
Living people
People from São Tomé
São Tomé and Príncipe footballers
Association football midfielders
Sporting Praia Cruz players
C.S. Marítimo players
Real S.C. players
Liga Portugal 2 players
Primeira Liga players
São Tomé and Príncipe international footballers
São Tomé and Príncipe expatriate footballers
São Tomé and Príncipe expatriate sportspeople in Portugal
Expatriate footballers in Portugal